Shivam Pathak is an Indian singer and songwriter. He participated in the indian idol season 5 and he was in the top 5.

Early life and career  
Pathak is from Lakhimpur (Kheri) Uttar Pradesh (Lucknow). He moved to Mumbai in 2008, to pursue a hardware and networking course. After completion, he was looking for a job, and a friend suggested he try his luck at music reality shows as he had a good voice. He participated in Indian Idol 5, as one of Top-5 selected finalists, but did not make the final three. He studied music under Suresh Wadkar for two years.

Discography

Awards and nominations

References

External links 

Living people
Indian male playback singers
Bollywood playback singers
21st-century Indian singers
Singers from Lucknow
21st-century Indian male singers
Year of birth missing (living people)